Canterbury Effect is a four-piece indie rock band based in Brazil, Indiana. The band has released three records. 2001's full length An Exercise in Humility was produced by Ed Rose and released through Pluto Records, as was 2003's EP Every Piece of Me. Four years later, We Are All Dogs was released through Crossroads of America Records. The album was recorded over a year and a half at Jon Hook's studio, Artisan Recordings, in Brazil, Indiana.

Discography
An Exercise in Humility (2001, Pluto Records)
Every Piece of Me (EP 2003, Pluto Records)
We Are All Dogs (2007, Crossroads of America Records)

External links
Canterbury Effect on Myspace
Crossroads of America Records official website
Canterbury Effect on PureVolume
Pluto Records official website

Musical groups established in 1998
American post-hardcore musical groups